Pentyrch Rugby Football Club is a Welsh rugby union club based in Pentyrch in Wales. Pentyrch RFC is a member of the Welsh Rugby Union and is a feeder club for the Cardiff Blues.

Pentrych RFC source their playing team mainly from local members of the community and also run a second team, veteran team, youth team and mini and junior section from age group Under-7's to Under-16's.

Club honours
 2008/09 WRU Division Four South East - Champions

Past players of note
  Tom Lewis
  Robin Sowden-Taylor
  Harry Robinson
  Seb Davies

References

Rugby clubs established in 1882
Welsh rugby union teams